A zirconate is an oxyanion containing zirconium. Examples include Na2ZrO3, Ca2ZrO3 which can be prepared by fusing zirconium dioxide with e.g. Na2O and CaO respectively.

References

 
Oxometallates